Lichenaula calligrapha is a species of moth of the family Xyloryctidae. It is known from rainforests from northern Queensland to Victoria, although it has also been recorded from the Australian Capital Territory, New South Wales and Tasmania.

Adults are on wing in November and January.

Original description

Food plants
The larvae probably feed on lichens.

References

Lichenaula
Moths described in 1890